The Doha Corniche is a waterfront promenade extending for  along Doha Bay in Qatar's capital city, Doha. Annual celebrations of national holidays such as Qatar National Day and National Sports Day are centered on the Doha Corniche. It is a popular tourist and leisure attraction within Qatar.

History

The Corniche used to be an empty stretch of walkway in which the only visible edifice was a Sheraton Hotel, but development has increased in the 21st century with dozens of skyscrapers being built towards the north of the Corniche. The area's development is part of the economic boom the country has been experiencing and part of an effort to promote tourism, which was facilitated by the 2006 Asian Games.

Many of Doha's most iconic landmarks are found along the Corniche, beginning from around the Museum of Islamic Art and ending at the Sheraton Park near the distinctive pyramid-shaped Sheraton Doha Resort & Convention Hotel.

Location
The Corniche encircles Doha Bay, running for a length of seven kilometers. There are three main areas of the Corniche: the Corniche Park and Promenade, Corniche Street, and the Government zone. 

The Corniche Promenade and Park are very popular destinations for walkers, runners, skaters, joggers and others engaging in leisure and social activities. 

Corniche Street is a paramount route which connects Doha's emerging West Bay business district with the south of the city and Doha International Airport. It was formed following extensive dredging work carried out during the late 1970s and early 1980s which reshaped Doha's coastline. 

As for the Government zone, which commands a view of the bay, administrative buildings such as the Amiri Diwan are found here.

Nearby landmarks

 Al Bidda Park 
 Commercialbank Plaza
 Doha Port
 Doha Tower
 Dubai Towers Doha
 Q-Post
 National Museum of Qatar
 Qatar National Theatre
 Richard Serra's sculpture 7
 View of West Bay skyline

Gallery

References

Doha
Geography of Qatar
Waterfronts
Venues of the 2006 Asian Games